Man Maya Airport , also known as Khanidanda Airport, is a domestic airport located in Rupakot Majhuwagadhi serving Khotang District, a district in Province No. 1 in Nepal.

History
The airport originally had a 590 meter long dirt runway which marred operations during the rainy season. The runway blacktopped in July 2015 at a cost of Rs 70 million, allowing for year-round operations. Simrik Airlines had announced plans to resume services to the airport.

In 2018, the airport was severely damaged by a landslide. It was reopened in 2020.

Airlines and destinations

The following airlines offer regular scheduled flights at Man Maya Airport:

References

Airports in Nepal